Miera is an unincorporated community in Union County, New Mexico, United States.

Notes

Unincorporated communities in Union County, New Mexico
Unincorporated communities in New Mexico